Aphrastasia is a genus of true bugs belonging to the family Adelgidae. The genus is monotypic, with the only species being Aphrastasia funitecta.

The genus was first described by Börner in 1909.

References

Adelgidae